Mandana may refer to 
Mandana (given name)
Mandane of Media, 6th century BCE princess of Media
Mandana Paintings in Rajasthan and Madhya Pradesh, India